The Proof of the Man is a 1913 American silent short drama film starring Alexander Gaden, Harry von Meter and Edna Maison.

Cast
 Alexander Gaden as Dick the Chosen Suitor
 Edna Maison as Alma Field, Dick's Wife
 Harry von Meter as Norman, a Lost Prospector
 George A. Holt as Bill, the Rejected Suitor

References

External links

1913 films
1913 drama films
Silent American drama films
American silent short films
American black-and-white films
1913 short films
1910s American films
1910s English-language films
American drama short films